Nicosia is a Town and comune of the province of Enna in Sicily, southern Italy. It is located at 720 m above the sea level, on a rocky massive culminating in four imposing hills. The origin of Nicosia is uncertain. Nicosia and Troina are the northernmost towns in the province of Enna . The vicinity was traditionally made up of salt mines and arable lands.

History 
Engio, Erbita and Imachara are the three cities of antiquity with which historians have attempted to identify Nicosia with, but there is no evidence that the mentioned towns are in fact Nicosia. 
The present name of the town suggests Greek Origins: it is believed to get its name from Saint Nicholas, who together with San Felix are the Patrons of the Town, . Another theory suggests it is a derivative of the Greek saying "City of Victory". 
The town is believed to stand on the site of the ancient Engynum.
The modern town was founded by Byzantine colonists in the 6th century. It expanded under the Arab domination and later under that of the Normans, who settled numerous immigrants from Lombardy and Piedmont, called "Lombards", giving rise to the Gallo-Italic dialect still spoken in the town and surrounds. King William II made Nicosia a royal city. It played an important strategic role, favoured by its position halfway between Palermo and Messina. It often gave hospitality to important figures, including Emperor Charles V.

Town structure
Nicosia’s past and present town’s structure show the artistic and cultural heritage of the Byzantine occupation. Fragments of its history are noticeable everywhere: in its churches, in its palaces, in the villas and even in the poor residential area. The circular net of trails takes the hiker through different parts of town, which is clustered up onto "del Castello", "del Salvatore", "di Monteoliveto" and "dei Cappuccini" rocky hills. Because of its particular structure Nicosia looks like a stairway to the sky. Walking through town, some of the main sights are the medieval and the baroque parts of town, with their aristocratic villas such as "La Motta Salinella", "La Motta S. Silvestro" and "La Via". Nicosia is perhaps better represented by its “masserie” , witnesses of the rural life and cultural legacy of generations of countrymen.

Main sights 

 Cathedral: built in the 14th century over a pre-existing Norman edifice, is dedicated to St. Nicholas. The façade has a noteworthy 15th century portal, while the interior houses a painting by Jusepe de Ribera. The campanile is from the 13th century.
 Santa Maria Maggiore: contains a 16th-century holy water stoup, the throne of Charles V, a fine marble polyptych by Antonello Gagini.
 San Benedetto: 14th century church.
 San Biagio: has paintings by Giuseppe Velasquez and a triptych by Antonello Gagini.
 Church of the Carmine: houses an Annunciation by Antonello Gagini.
 Santissimo Salvatore: church atop the peak above the town
 ''Palazzo Cirino, Nicosia

There are also remains of the Norman castle in the upper part of the town.

See also
Roman Catholic Diocese of Nicosia, Sicily

References

Municipalities of the Province of Enna
Populated places established in the 6th century
6th-century establishments in Italy
6th-century establishments in the Byzantine Empire